Recorders of the Court of First Instance of the High Court, commonly referred to as a High Court Recorder, is a position for experienced practitioners (so far, only Senior Counsel have been appointed) who are willing to sit as a High Court Judge for a few weeks every year, but are not prepared to commit themselves to a permanent, full-time appointment. It was intended to act as a more formal system of appointment compared to the more ad hoc nature of appointment of Deputy High Court Judges; this position is broadly the same as a Recorder in England and Wales.

Recorders are appointed on a 3 year term basis. Since the establishment of the position in 1995, there have been 48 Recorders; of those, 12 (or 25%) became full-time judges. There are currently 15 serving Recorders.

List of Recorders 
Recorders are listed by date of appointment; seniority (when Recorders are appointed on the same day) is sorted by firstly the year of becoming Silk, secondly by year of being called to the Hong Kong Bar, and lastly by alphabetical order.  
 Robert Tang QC SC (1995–2004); later appointed as full-time judge
 Edward Chan QC SC (1995–2007)
 Ronny Wong QC SC (1995–2007)
 Robert Kotewall SC (1997–2000)
 Jacqueline Leong SC (1997–2006)
 Roberto Ribeiro SC (1997–1999); later appointed as full-time judge
 Kenneth Kwok SC (1997–2006)
 Lawrence Lok SC (1997–2006)
 Wong Ching-yue SC (1997–2006)
 Andrew Liao SC (2000–2002)
 Gladys Li SC (2000–2003)
 Geoffrey Ma SC (2000–2001); later appointed as full-time judge
 Michael Lunn SC (2000–2003); later appointed as full-time judge
 Benjamin Yu SC (2003–2012)
 Joseph Fok SC (2003–2009); later appointed as full-time judge
 Patrick Fung SC (2006–2015)
 Gerard McCoy SC (2006–2009)
 Andrew Macrae SC (2006–2010); later appointed as full-time judge
 Ambrose Ho SC (2006–2012)
 Jat Sew-tong SC (2006–2015)
 Anthony Chan SC (2006–2012); later appointed as full-time judge
 Paul Shieh SC (2006–2015)
 Rimsky Yuen SC (2006–2012)
 Anderson Chow SC (2010–2014); later appointed as full-time judge
 Horace Wong SC (2010–2013)
 Jason Pow SC (2013–2022)
 Lisa Wong SC (2013–2017); later appointed as full-time judge
 Russell Coleman SC (2013–2019); later appointed as full-time judge
 Anthony Houghton SC (2013–2022)
 Robert Whitehead SC (2015–2018)
 Teresa Cheng SC (2015–2018)
 Winnie Tam SC (2015– )
 Stewart Wong SC (2015– )
 Linda Chan SC (2015–2019); later appointed as full-time judge
 Eugene Fung SC (2018– )
 Charles Manzoni SC (2018– )
 Yvonne Cheng SC (2018–2022); later appointed as full-time judge
 Martin Hui SC (2021– )
 Eva Sit SC (2021– )
 Rachel Lam SC (2021– )
 William Wong SC (2021– )
Victor Dawes SC (2021– )
Richard Khaw SC (2021– )
José-Antonio Maurellet SC (2021– )
Abraham Chan SC (2021– )
Jin Pao SC (2021– )
Maggie Wong SC (2022– )
Derek Chan SC (2022– )

References 

Hong Kong
Courts
Law of Hong Kong